Deafness, Y-linked 1 (DFNY1) is a protein that in humans is encoded by the DFNY1 gene. Y-linked hearing impairment (DFNY1, MIM 400043) is one of the few Mendelian disorders showing Y-linkage in humans.

References

Further reading 

 
 

Genes
Human proteins